Midgard is an open-end, medieval fantasy play-by-mail game. It was published in 1984 by Time Space Simulations. Through 1996, the game passed through more than four different publishers, including Midgard USA. As of 2022, Talisman Games is the publisher. At initial publication, Midgard was computer moderated with partial human moderation. 

The game's context is medieval Europe. Gameplay occurs on a continent about the size of Greenland. The game's purpose is to achieve high status in the feudal system. Players begin the game with a few loyal friends, some retainers, and some resources and pursue tasks to gain Influence Points in order to rise in the ranks of the player's chosen affiliate or group. Economic and combat systems are well developed and detailed. The game was reviewed multiple times in the 1980s and 1990s, receiving generally positive marks for gameplay with negatives for a gamemaster of the period. Midgard scored #9 on the Best Play By Mail Game of 1987 list in Paper Mayhem Magazine.

Play-by-mail history
Some games have long been played by mail (PBM) between two players, such as chess and Go. PBM play of Diplomacy—a multiplayer game—began in 1963. The emergence of the professional PBM industry occurred less than a decade later. Rick Loomis, "generally recognized as the founder of the PBM industry", accomplished this by launching Flying Buffalo Inc. and his first PBM game, Nuclear Destruction, in 1970. Professional game moderation started in 1971 at Flying Buffalo. Chris Harvey started commercial PBM play afterward in the United Kingdom with a company called ICBM through an agreement with Loomis and Flying Buffalo. ICBM, followed by KJC games and Mitregames, led the UK PBM industry. For approximately five years, Flying Buffalo was the single dominant company in the US PBM industry until Schubel & Son entered the field in about 1976 with the human-moderated The Tribes of Crane. Superior Simulations was the next significant PBM company to enter the US market. They did so in 1978 with the game Empyrean Challenge which one observer stated was "the most complex game system on Earth".

The early 1980s saw additional growth for PBM. The player base grew and game moderators were plentiful. The most popular games in 1980 were Starweb and Tribes of Crane. The PBM industry in 1980 comprised two large companies and some small ones. In 1981, some PBM players started another company, Adventures by Mail, with the "immensely popular" Beyond the Stellar Empire. It was within this environment that Midgard was launched.

Development
Midgard was published in 1984. The game's developer was Mark Stiffler. In 1986, Stiffler and his wife Talla as well as additional gamemasters ran Midgard under the publishing company Time Space Simulations. Reviewer Charles Day noted that in 1986, the gamemasters processed each turn with "a personal touch", indicating human moderation.

As of 1987, the publisher stated the game had more than 900 tribes, with the potential for about 300–400 players. Turn results in the 1980s included carbon paper to allow players to handwrite turn orders to send to the gamemaster while keeping a copy. As of 1987, the publisher used a MacIntosh computer running FileMaker Pro database for tracking some data while the gamemasters handled special actions. Prior to 1996, Midgard had changed hands to four or more publishers. According to reviewer John Rayment, Stiffler passed the game on to other gamemasters who were unable to adequately manage it. Eventually, Delta Games gave Midgard a major update.

In 1996, the game was run by Midguard USA and was "computer moderated with three hand moderated special actions per turn".

Gameplay
The game's context is medieval Europe after a period of conflict. Players have 18 available provinces which are further divided into smaller regions and hexes for a playing area about the size of Greenland. The Midgard continent has more than 250 cities. Players begin the game with a few loyal friends, some money, and about 200 retainers.  An enjoyable aspect of gameplay is management of the retainers which could be controlled with 43 different orders. Progress in the game is made by accepting and accomplishing tasks (e.g., road construction, rescue, or reconnaissance) for rewards. Players can choose diverse styles of play including combative, capitalistic, and religious. 

Turn results are detailed and comprehensive. Results average between 8 and 10 printed pages per turn. The game has well-developed and detailed economic and combat systems. The combat system can accommodate battles in size from 200 to over 200,000 troops. Reviewer Nicky Palmer stated that battle reports were extremely detailed. A gamemaster during the playtest provided a battle report for a siege with four pages of maps and eight pages of text.

The purpose of Midgard is to achieve high status in the feudal system. Players can choose from multiple affiliations—or groups—at the start of the game, including families, religions, guilds, and even bandits or pirates. Players rise in their affiliation by gaining Influence Points, with those achieving the most points in a group becoming the Senior Player who has additional authority and resources. Alliances and cross-faction missions and tasks are also possible.

Midgard is an open-ended game. However, players at the pinnacle of their factions who reach a secret point total are promoted out of the game. Players who do this five times receive the title of Grand Master.

Reception and legacy
Nicky Palmer reviewed the game in the Spring 1985 issue of Flagship. He concluded that "the game requires a fairly high degree of player commitment, but offers an exciting life as you lead your gallant band through the vicious cross-currents of Midgard's planetary power struggle. Anyone interested in games in the Tribes of Crane tradition should give it a close look". 

Reviewer Charles R. Day stated in the July–August 1986 issue of Paper Mayhem magazine that the quality of the game's products such as the turnsheets and reports were the "best ever offered in a PBM game". He concluded that "If you're looking for a game which will test your skills of not only military, but politics and economics as well; if you're looking for  game that offers excellent player inter-action or just to be on your own style of play, then Midguard [sic] is the game", noting that it is for players of all levels.

The main complaint players had in the initial years was a slow turnaround time for game turns which had been corrected by 1987. Midgard scored #9 on the Best Play By Mail Game of 1987 list in Paper Mayhem Magazine. In 1996, reviewer B. E. Wright stated that "Midgard is a fine game", holding back top marks due to a negative experience with a gamemaster at the time.  He noted that the game had been on an upward trend in quality recently, suggesting that appeared to be continuing and that players of the period should "Go in with moderate expectations and you may find Midgard one of the best PBM games ever. And it may be in time. We shall see".

See also
 List of play-by-mail games

Notes

References

Bibliography

Further reading
 

Play-by-mail games
Games and sports introduced in 1984